Spooner Lake is a man-made reservoir located just north of the intersection of Highway 50 and Highway 28 near Spooner Summit, a pass in the Carson Range of the Sierra Nevada leading to Carson City, Nevada from Lake Tahoe. It is located in Lake Tahoe – Nevada State Park.

History
There are historical references to an "M. E. Spooner" and "Spooner & Co.'s House" in the area but the first documented eponymous reference was "a strip of productive land extends back from the lake for a distance of 2 miles, where it is called Spooner's Meadow". A dam constructed in 1927 to store irrigation water converted the eastern part of Spooner Meadow into a small lake. Since the 1930s Spooner Lake has also been used for recreational fishing.

Watershed and Geographical characteristics
The Spooner Lake watershed is approximately  but peak flows from the lake are limited by Spooner Dam. The dam was re-built in 1982 due to leakage.

It is fed by numerous seeps and snowmelt and its outflow below Spooner Dam is to North Canyon Creek in Spooner Meadow. North Canyon Creek then heads west and then northwest along Highway 28 before turning to the southwest and flowing down Slaughterhouse Canyon to Glenbook and Lake Tahoe. The creek flows through the Toiyabe National Forest on its journey to Lake Tahoe.

Recreation
In 1973, the Nevada Department of Wildlife began stocking the Spooner Lake with trout. Trout species include the native Lahontan cutthroat trout (Oncorhynchus clarkii henshawi), as well as multiple non-native species and hybrids including rainbow trout (Oncorhynchus mykiss), brown trout (Salmo trutta), bowcutt trout (rainbow x cutthroat), brook trout (Salvenlinus fontinalis), and tiger trout (brown x brook). However, the lake's shallowness has made trout overwintering difficult and native Lahontan tui chub (Gila bicolor) have come to dominate the lake's fish species.  Regulations changed from general (allowing harvest) to zero-harvest in 1982 and then to a 5 fish limit in 2006.

Spooner Lake is also the start of a 5-mile hiking trail to Marlette Lake via North Canyon and the Tahoe Rim Trail.

See also
Lake Tahoe - Nevada State Park
Tahoe Rim Trail

References

External links
 
 Nevada State Parks - Spooner Lake

Reservoirs in Nevada
Carson City, Nevada
Douglas County, Nevada
Lake Tahoe
1927 establishments in Nevada